Mikulov is a municipality and village in Teplice District in the Ústí nad Labem Region of the Czech Republic. It has about 200 inhabitants.

References

Villages in Teplice District
Villages in the Ore Mountains